Charles Everette Peterson (October 2, 1889 – December 1959) was an American football and basketball coach and college dean. He served as the head football coach at San Diego State University from 1921 to 1929, compiling a record of 43–31–4. He was also the head basketball coach at San Diego State from 1921 to 1926, tallying a mark of 70–30.

Head coaching record

Football

References

1889 births
1959 deaths
San Diego State Aztecs athletic directors
San Diego State Aztecs football coaches
San Diego State Aztecs men's basketball coaches
College track and field coaches in the United States
People from Kearney, Missouri
Sportspeople from Portland, Oregon